Sisyrinchium atlanticum, the eastern blue-eyed grass or Atlantic blue-eyed-grass, is a species of flowering plant in the family Iridaceae.

Habitat
The preferred habitat is moist sandy shores and grasslands.

Range
The species is found in eastern North America, from Maine south to Florida and Mississippi.

References

External links

atlanticum
Plants described in 1896